E73 may refer to:
 European route E73
 King's Indian Defense, Encyclopaedia of Chess Openings code
 Okayama Expressway and Yonago Expressway, route E73 in Japan